Horizon Djibouti FC, more commonly known as Horizon Djibouti or simply Horizon, is a Djiboutian football club located in the city of Djibouti in Djibouti. It currently plays in the Djibouti Premier League.

Stadium
Currently the team plays at the 40000 capacity Stade du Ville.

References

External links
Soccerway

Football clubs in Djibouti